Pucker Up: The Fine Art of Whistling is a documentary film on the 31st Louisburg International Whistling Competition that follows a Washington D.C. investment banker, a Dutch social worker and a turkey hauler among others as they compete for a prize in competitive whistling.

Awards and recognition

Florida Film Festival -- Audience Award for Best Feature Documentary 
Florida Film Festival -- Special Jury Award for Excellence in Documentary Filmmaking
Official Selection: SXSW (world premiere)
Museum and TV & Radio Documentary Film Festival (non-competitive fest)
Official Selection: Newport Film Festival
Seattle International Film Festival
AFI / Discovery Silver Docs Film Festival
Melbourne International Film Festival
Edinburgh International Film Festival
Woods Hole Film Festival
Atlanta Film Festival
Martha's Vineyard Film Festival

External links
 Qball Productions

 
Biographical documentary films
American documentary films
Whistlers